Sauveterre-de-Béarn (literally Sauveterre of Béarn;) is a medieval village perched above the Gave d'Oloron and facing the Pyrenees in south-western France. It is a commune in the Pyrénées-Atlantiques department.

History
While the stone portions of the drawbridge remain, the wooden section is no longer there and the terminal of the bridge has been walled. The church and many buildings remain in their original condition.

In the Middle Ages the town was used to keep a watch from its lofty heights on Gascony and the bordering Navarre. The remains of the bridge provide the most impressive view of the town above.

Miscellaneous

Sauveterre de Bearn appeared in the Trevanian (aka Rod Whitaker) novel The Summer of Katya under the name Alos. In the book, it is where the Festival of the Drowned Virgin takes place.

See also
Communes of the Pyrénées-Atlantiques department

References

Communes of Pyrénées-Atlantiques
Pyrénées-Atlantiques communes articles needing translation from French Wikipedia